Mauritius has been administered by various colonial head since it was discovered until it became an independent state;

 Governor of Dutch Mauritius (Opperhoofd of Mauritius) – 1598 to 1718
 Governor of Isle de France (Mauritius) (Gouverneur d'Isle de France) – 1721 to 1810
 Governor of British Mauritius (Governor of Mauritius) – 1810 to 1968

See also

 Governor-General of Mauritius – 1968 to 1992
 President of Mauritius – 1992 to present
 Prime Minister of Mauritius – 1968 to present
 Queen of Mauritius – 1968 to 1992

 
Lists of Mauritian people
Mauritius